Concept virus refers to two different pieces of computer malware, each of which has acted as a proof of concept for a new method of propagation:

WM.Concept (1995), the first macro virus to spread through Microsoft Word (though not the first macro virus per se) 
Nimda (2001), named Concept Virus by its author, one of the first multi-vector Windows viruses.